Athir Thomas Magor Abdo Gaber (born 14 February 1987) is a South Sudanese footballer who plays as a defender.

Career 
He started his professional career 2008 with Al-Mourada SC. The defender joined in January 2011 to Al-Hilal Club (Omdurman) for Physical Education Omdurman. After one year with Al Hilal Omdurman, Ateir Tomes signed in May 2012 for Al-Ahli Khartoum.

International career 
He mas made at least one senior appearances for South Sudan against Kenya in the 2012 CECAFA Cup.

International goals
Scores and results list South Sudan's goal tally first.

References

1987 births
Living people
South Sudan international footballers
Sudan international footballers
South Sudanese expatriate footballers
South Sudanese footballers
Association football defenders
Dual internationalists (football)
Al-Mourada SC players
Al-Hilal Club (Omdurman) players
Al Ahli SC (Khartoum) players
Al-Fahaheel FC players
Al-Nahda Club (Saudi Arabia) players
Saudi First Division League players
Expatriate footballers in Kuwait
Expatriate footballers in Saudi Arabia
People from Juba
Kuwait Premier League players
South Sudanese expatriate sportspeople in Kuwait
South Sudanese expatriate sportspeople in Saudi Arabia